Death to Anders (pronounced "onders") is an American indie rock band formed in Los Angeles, California in 2006. Their lineup consists of Rob Danson (vocals and guitar), Rob Hume (bass and background vocals), and Robert Smith (drums).

Death to Anders is active in the influential Echo Park and Silver Lake music scenes in Los Angeles and were founding members of the Central Second Collective, a group of up-and-coming rock musicians dedicated to promoting innovative, new music in Los Angeles.

Often compared to Pavement, early Modest Mouse and Sonic Youth but defying classification, Death to Anders shift between hypnotic melodies and raging dissonance as they mix, rock with Gothic Americana.

Formation and history: 2004-present 
Death to Anders was first formed as a duo in 2004, under the name of the "Thick Liquid Sucker Punch", by Danson and original guitarist Nick Ceglio while the two were students at the Musician's Institute in Hollywood, California. While most of their classmates were interested in heavy metal or progressive rock, the two bonded over their shared enthusiasm for Sonic Youth, the Pixies, and Pavement.

Death to Anders joined with several other young Los Angeles bands, including the Happy Hollows, the Transmissions, One Trick Pony, The Henry Clay People, Anchors for Architects, and DiE ROCKERS DiE, to form the Central Second Collective, a group dedicated to promoting innovative, independent music.  The collective's name refers to the Cocaine, an indie club within 2nd Street Jazz, a venue located at Central and 2nd Avenues in the Little Tokyo district of downtown Los Angeles. Although the Central Second Collective no longer formally exists, member bands continue to play and record together, appearing regularly in the independent and underground clubs of the Silverlake and Echo Park music scenes, the birthplace of successful indie bands like Beck, Elliott Smith, Rilo Kiley, Sea Wolf, and Silversun Pickups. Several of the Second Central Collective bands, including Death to Anders, are also featured in the book Gooseberries, a collection of portraits by Los Angeles music photojournalist Sterling Andrews released through Eenie Meenie Records in the Spring of 2009.

Death to Anders self-produced their first album "Punctuate the Calamities" in the Fall of 2006, and after recording with British producer David Newton (formerly of the Mighty Lemon Drops) at Rollercoaster Recording in 2007, they released two albums in 2008, a full-length entitled "Fictitious Business" and an EP entitled "Enigmatic Market". In 2010, Danson re-formed Death to Anders as a trio featuring bassist Rob Hume and drummer Robert Smith.

In 2011, armed with new material, they released the E.P. "Don't Give Up", which was recorded at Infrasonic Sound (No Age, Wavves, Fools Gold) and mixed by Ali Nikou at BlasterMaster Productions in Los Angeles. Death to Anders released their E.P. on October 25, 2011, during L.A blog Buzz Bands' three-year anniversary show at The Echo in Echo Park, California, where they shared the bill with Everest and Hands.

Musical style and influences 
 The dissonant tones, dynamic melodies and complex song structures that shape the Death to Anders sound reveal a broad array of influences and reflect the diversity of its members. Hailing from different areas of the United States - Boulder, Colorado (Danson); Eindhoven, The Netherlands (Hume); and Detroit, Michigan (Smith) - the band integrates genres as varied as punk rock, indie rock, and alternative country. While their work has been compared to Pavement, early Modest Mouse, the Pixies, and Sonic Youth, it is also described as difficult to classify, "radical", and "fresh".

Rob Hume's highly melodic bass work, inspired by Bruce Thomas of the Attractions, is effortlessly integrated with Smith's energetic, Keith Moon (The Who) and Jimmy Chamberlin (Smashing Pumpkins) inspired drums. Danson's lead vocals, which range from the quietly sincere to squealing intensity betray the influence of Stephen Malkmus, Nick Cave and Isaac Brock.

Death to Anders are also known for their intelligent, darkly humorous and often mysterious lyrics, which are written by Danson and Ceglio and inspired by the literary works of Henry Miller, Albert Camus, Fyodor Dostoevsky, Tom Robbins, and Chuck Palahniuk. The title of the band's debut album, "Punctuate the Calamities", is even a reference to Miller's Tropic of Cancer.

Discography

Albums 
 Punctuate the Calamities (self-released, 2006)
 Fictitious Business (self-released, produced by David Newton, 2008)

EPs and singles 
 "Punctuate the Calamities" (self-released, produced by Death to Anders, 2006)
 "Fictitious Business" (self released, produced by David Newton, 2008)
 "Enigmatic Market EP" (self-released, produced by David Newton, 2008)
 "Don't Give Up" (self-released, produced by Eric Palmquist and Death to Anders, 2011)

Notes

References

External links 
Official Death to Anders Myspace page
Death to Anders on Youtube
Death to Anders on Hype Machine

Musical groups established in 2006
Indie rock musical groups from California
Musical groups from Los Angeles